A teacake in England is generally a light yeast-based sweet bun containing dried fruit, typically served toasted and buttered. In the U.S. teacakes can be cookies or small cakes. In Sweden, they are soft, round, flat wheat  breads made with milk and a little sugar, and used to make buttered ham or cheese sandwiches. In India and Australia, a teacake is more like a butter cake. Tea refers to the popular beverage to which these baked goods are an accompaniment.

Regional variations

England
In most of England, a teacake is a light, sweet, yeast-based bun containing dried fruits, most usually currants, sultanas or peel. It is typically split, toasted, buttered, and served with tea. It is flat and circular, with a smooth brown upper surface and a somewhat lighter underside. Although most people refer to a teacake as a cake containing fruit, in East Lancashire, certain areas of Yorkshire and Cumbria the name currant teacake is used to distinguish fruited 'cakes' from plain bread rolls. In West Yorkshire, a large plain white or brown bread roll 9 inches or 225 mm diameter is often also called a teacake and is used to make very large sandwiches. Many cafes sell these for breakfast or midmorning snacks. In Kent, the teacake is known as a "huffkin", which is often flavoured with hops, especially at the time of harvesting hops in September. In Sussex, a luxurious version of the teacake with added aromatics such as nutmeg, cinnamon and rose water is still sometimes made and called a manchet or Lady Arundel's Manchet.

In East Lancashire, the former West Riding of Yorkshire, Cumbria a teacake is a round bread roll which is cut in half to make sandwiches. They do not usually contain any sort of dried fruit. They can be made with either white, brown, wholemeal, or Granary flour (a brand of flour produced by Hovis, made by malting wheat, crushing the grains, roasting them, and then mixing them with brown flour).

Sweden and Finland
In Sweden, the word for teacake (tekaka) refers to a sweetened wheat yeast bread. It is served warm with butter and jam. It is often served with cheese as well. In Finland there is a similar dish called teeleipä.

United States
In the Southeastern United States, a teacake is a traditional dense large cookie, made with sugar, butter, eggs, flour, milk, and flavoring. They are particularly associated with the African-American community and were originally developed as an analog of the pastries served to guests by white women when entertaining.

Australia/India
In Australia and India, a teacake is typically a butter cake, usually ready to serve warm from the oven in less than 30 minutes. Ingredients typically consist of flour, eggs, butter, cinnamon and sugar. It is traditionally served warm as an accompaniment to tea. Australian teacakes are sprinkled with cinnamon and fine (caster) sugar, and are usually served warm from the oven with additional butter. Indian recipes avoid cinnamon.

See also

 Chocolate teacakes, a kind of chocolate-coated marshmallow treat
 Coffee cake, a class of cakes that are served with coffee
 Funing big cake
 List of sweet breads
 Madeleine (cake), a type of individual French cake, shell shaped 
 Russian tea cake, also called Mexican wedding cookies, a kind of cookie that originated in Russia
 Tea (meal)
 Tea culture
 Tea loaf

References

External links
Teacake – Merriam-Webster

English cuisine
British breads
Cakes
Sweet breads